Leptospira interrogans is a species of obligate aerobic spirochaete bacteria shaped like a corkscrew with hooked and spiral ends. L. interrogans is mainly found in warmer tropical regions. The bacteria can live for weeks to months in the ground or water. Leptospira is one of the genera of the spirochaete phylum that causes severe mammalian infections. This species is pathogenic to some wild and domestic animals, including pet dogs. It can also spread to humans through abrasions on the skin, where infection can cause flu-like symptoms with kidney and liver damage. Human infections are commonly spread by contact with contaminated water or soil, often through the urine of both wild and domestic animals. Some individuals are more susceptible to serious infection, including farmers and veterinarians who work with animals.  

The bacteria cause two phases of infection, the anicteric phase and the icteric phase. The anicteric phase of infection is commonly known as phase one, in which humans exhibit fever, headache, and nausea. The icteric phase, or phase two, includes more severe symptoms including hemorrhages and renal tubular failure. The main ways for testing for bacteria and diagnosing infections include the microscopic agglutination test (MAT) and PCR. Leptospirosis is treated in humans by the antibiotics penicillin and doxycycline.

L. interrogans has many properties that ensure its optimal survival in specific conditions, including two periplasmic flagella for movement and mobility. These flagella enable L. interrogans to more easily access and infect both human and mammalian tissues. The species uses beta oxidation of long chain fatty acids for energy, in which oxygen and peroxides are used as the main terminal electron acceptors. The L. interrogans genome consists of two circular chromosomes.

Biology and Biochemistry

Morphology 
L. interrogans cells are gram-negative, tightly coiled, motile spirochetes, with two periplasmic flagella. One flagellum is inserted at each end of the bacterium. The cells are thin, about 0.15 µm, and long, between 6-20 µm, with a corkscrew shaped body with spiral or hooked ends. The hooked ends often resemble a question mark, and this is where the name ‘interrogans’ comes from. The periplasmic flagella are crucial to the bacteria's ability to move and survive in specific host cells. The leptospires reveal two unique forms of movement, translational and non translational.

Metabolism/Physiology 
L. interrogans displays neutralophilic properties, growing in a pH range of 7.2 - 7.6, with an optimal pH of 7.4. The bacteria also display mesophilic growth properties and grow at a temperature range of 28 ℃ to 30 ℃. The optimal growth of the obligate aerobe L. interrogans occurs in simple media containing vitamins, salts, and specific long chain fatty acids. Leptospira require ammonium salts as well as long-chain fatty acids for metabolism. 

The major energy and carbon source of this organism is the beta-oxidation of long chain fatty acids. Through naturally occurring phase interfaces or its growth media, L. interrogans must physically obtain the long chain fatty acids in order to further metabolize them as an energy source. Unique to the metabolic characteristics of L. interrogans, long chain unsaturated fatty acids are required for the bacterium to grow, as saturated fatty acids can only be metabolized in these conditions. L. interrogans contains genes that code for the use of the TCA cycle in its metabolism. L. interrogans ATP production comes through oxidative phosphorylation. Oxygen serves as the terminal electron acceptor in this beta-oxidation, further classifying this bacterium as an obligate aerobe. Evidence has also shown that peroxides such as H2O2 can also serve as a terminal electron acceptor, with catalase activity needed for survival in vivo.  L. interrogans has only one glucose uptake system, known as the glucose sodium symporter.

Genomics 
The L. interrogans genome consists of two circular chromosomes composed of a total of almost 4.7 Mbp. The larger chromosome has a total genome of 4.3 Mbp, and the smaller chromosome has a size of 350 Kbp. It has a G+C content of 35% and contains 3,400-3,700 protein-coding genes, depending on the strain. The genes on the large chromosome encodes mostly housekeeping functions. Unlike most other bacteria, where the rRNA genes are clustered, in Leptospira the 16S, 23S, and 5S rRNA genes are scattered on the large chromosome. Genes specifically encoding for long-chain fatty-acid usage, the TCA cycle, and electron transport chain have also been identified in L. interrogans. The detection of such genes confirms the use of oxidative phosphorylation as the primary metabolic pathway of L. interrogans. A large amount of genes related to eukaryotic cell invasion, cell attachment, and motility have been discovered. L. interrogans also has a complex set of genes associated with chemotaxis, more so than other pathogenic bacteria such as B. burgdorferi and T. palladium. Such genes able L. interrogans to be such a successful pathogen.  

To have the energy necessary for growth and to take over host functions, the bacterium employs methods such as oxidative stress. Stress responses seen in L. interrogans include the up-regulation expression of genes encoding proteins such as chaperone proteins including clpA, heat shock proteins including GroEL, and endoflagellar proteins including flgA.

Molecular pathogenesis 
The loa22 gene has been classified as a virulence factor.

LipL32 is the most abundant protein in L. interrogans. Although LipL32 binds to a number of extracellular matrix components in test tube experiments, there is doubt regarding where this protein is located. One study suggests that it is a subsurface membrane lipoprotein on the inner leaflet of the outer membrane. Some outer membrane proteins, such as OmpL1, aid in the infection process of L. interrogans by allowing adherence to host cells's surface molecules.

As L. interrogans is an obligate aerobe, reactive oxygen species (ROS) must be avoided during metabolism. The perRA and perRB genes encode peroxide responsive regulators, and these regulators promote host adaptation as they contain approximately 17 genes which aid in signaling. L. interrogans also has a rather complex chemotaxis system compared to other pathogenic microbes, contributing to its effectiveness as a pathogen. Virulence is also related to the leptospiral LPS, which is known to uniquely activate macrophages in response to infection.

The bacterial chaperone ClpB is a major driver in the overall virulence of L. interrogans, as it aids in survival inside the host, the control of stress responses, and the unique role of protein disaggregation.

Environment 
L. interrogans are host-associated bacteria, and most infections occur in tropical regions. In the host environment, L. interrogans are first found in the blood and subsequently moves on to infect several organs. In particular, L. interrogans cells survive and multiply at an optimal rate in the kidneys. The pathogen mostly spreads through the bodily fluids of infected animals. Rats are the primary carrier of leptospirosis but do not present any symptoms, transmitting the pathogen through urine, which is able to persist in freshwater. The pathogen can then enter the body of a new host through the skin and mucous membranes, as well as through the consumption of contaminated waters. Leptospira often enter the body through open cuts and other wounds, though they are unable to pass through an intact skin barrier. Infected wild and domestic animals can continue to excrete the bacteria into the environment for several years, and the bacteria can survive in soil and water for months at a time.

Disease

Humans  
In humans, symptoms caused by L. interrogans are biphasic, icteric, or anicteric. The icteric form is also known as Weil’s disease. It has been shown in studies that L. interrogans may damage the endothelial cell lining of various vessels and organs, allowing them to leak and further spread the bacteria to other parts of the body. Symptoms can appear anywhere between 2 to 4 weeks after exposure. Phase 1 of infection is anicteric, and symptoms include fever, chills, headache, muscle aches, vomiting and diarrhea. Roughly 90% of infectious cases in humans will only consist of this phase; however, it is possible for the disease to progress into phase 2, known as the icteric phase. Symptoms of the icteric phase include petechiae, hepatomegaly, jaundice, renal tubular damage, hemorrhages, and subsequent renal insufficiency. Leptospirosis is treated with the antibiotics doxycycline and penicillin.

There are more than 200 diverse pathogenic Leptospira serovars, making it challenging to develop an effective vaccine. However, vaccines for the serovars known as Hardjo, Pomona, Canicola, Grippotyphosa and icterohaemorrhagiae have been developed. Unfortunately, these vaccines display suboptimal protection, need frequent booster doses, and are specific to certain serovars.

Dogs 
Leptospirosis in canines can be divided into the four categories of reproductive, icteric, hemorrhagic, and uremic. Reproductive leptospirosis results in the premature birth of offspring or abortion, and uremic leptospirosis is referred to as Stuttgart disease. L. interrogans triggers a highly inflammatory response in infected dogs. This inflammatory response results in the high expression of tumor necrosis factor alpha, referred to as TNF-α, in the uterine tissue of infected dogs. Interleukin-1β and interleukin-6 also exhibit increased levels of expression upon infection. Furthermore, L. interrogans is proven to result in the down-regulation of extracellular matrix (ECM) mRNA and proteins. These factors are likely correlated with the high susceptibility of canines to leptospirosis.

References

External links 
 https://www.ncbi.nlm.nih.gov/Taxonomy/Browser/wwwtax.cgi?id=173
 Leptospira protein abundances
 Type strain of Leptospira interrogans at BacDive -  the Bacterial Diversity Metadatabase

interrogans